XXV is a studio album by Finnish punk band Klamydia. XXV debuted at number one on the Official Finnish Albums Chart.

Track listing
Digital download

Charts

References

2013 albums
Klamydia albums
Finnish-language albums